In number theory, a Williams number base b is a natural number of the form  for integers b ≥ 2 and n ≥ 1. The Williams numbers base 2 are exactly the Mersenne numbers.

Williams prime

A Williams prime is a Williams number that is prime. They were considered by Hugh C. Williams.

Least n ≥ 1 such that (b−1)·bn − 1 is prime are: (start with b = 2)
2, 1, 1, 1, 1, 1, 3, 1, 1, 1, 1, 2, 1, 14, 1, 1, 2, 6, 1, 1, 1, 55, 12, 1, 133, 1, 20, 1, 2, 1, 1, 2, 15, 3, 1, 7, 136211, 1, 1, 7, 1, 7, 7, 1, 1, 1, 2, 1, 25, 1, 5, 3, 1, 1, 1, 1, 2, 3, 1, 1, 899, 3, 11, 1, 1, 1, 63, 1, 13, 1, 25, 8, 3, 2, 7, 1, 44, 2, 11, 3, 81, 21495, 1, 2, 1, 1, 3, 25, 1, 519, 77, 476, 1, 1, 2, 1, 4983, 2, 2, ...

, the largest known Williams prime base 3 is 2×31360104−1.

Generalization

A Williams number of the second kind base b is a natural number of the form  for integers b ≥ 2 and n ≥ 1, a Williams prime of the second kind  is a Williams number of the second kind that is prime. The Williams primes of the second kind base 2 are exactly the Fermat primes.

Least n ≥ 1 such that (b−1)·bn + 1 is prime are: (start with b = 2)
1, 1, 1, 2, 1, 1, 2, 1, 3, 10, 3, 1, 2, 1, 1, 4, 1, 29, 14, 1, 1, 14, 2, 1, 2, 4, 1, 2, 4, 5, 12, 2, 1, 2, 2, 9, 16, 1, 2, 80, 1, 2, 4, 2, 3, 16, 2, 2, 2, 1, 15, 960, 15, 1, 4, 3, 1, 14, 1, 6, 20, 1, 3, 946, 6, 1, 18, 10, 1, 4, 1, 5, 42, 4, 1, 828, 1, 1, 2, 1, 12, 2, 6, 4, 30, 3, 3022, 2, 1, 1, 8, 2, 4, 4, 2, 11, 8, 2, 1, ... 

, the largest known Williams prime of the second kind base 3 is 2×31175232+1.

A Williams number of the third kind base b is a natural number of the form  for integers b ≥ 2 and n ≥ 1, the Williams number of the third kind base 2 are exactly the Thabit numbers. A Williams prime of the third kind  is a Williams number of the third kind that is prime.

It is conjectured that for every b ≥ 2, there are infinitely many Williams primes of the first kind (the original Williams primes) base b, infinitely many Williams primes of the second kind base b, and infinitely many Williams primes of the third kind base b. Besides, if b is not = 1 mod 3, then there are infinitely many Williams primes of the fourth kind base b.

Dual form

If we let n take negative values, and choose the numerator of the numbers, then we get these numbers:

Dual Williams numbers of the first kind base b: numbers of the form  with b ≥ 2 and n ≥ 1.

Dual Williams numbers of the second kind base b: numbers of the form  with b ≥ 2 and n ≥ 1.

Dual Williams numbers of the third kind base b: numbers of the form  with b ≥ 2 and n ≥ 1.

Dual Williams numbers of the fourth kind base b: numbers of the form  with b ≥ 2 and n ≥ 1. (not exist when b = 1 mod 3)

Unlike the original Williams primes of each kind, some large dual Williams primes of each kind are only probable primes, since for these primes N, neither N−1 not N+1 can be trivially written into a product.

(for the smallest dual Williams primes of the 1st, 2nd and 3rd kinds base b, see ,  and )

It is conjectured that for every b ≥ 2, there are infinitely many dual Williams primes of the first kind (the original Williams primes) base b, infinitely many dual Williams primes of the second kind base b, and infinitely many dual Williams primes of the third kind base b. Besides, if b is not = 1 mod 3, then there are infinitely many dual Williams primes of the fourth kind base b.

See also
 Thabit number, which is exactly the Williams number of the third kind base 2

References

External links

 The primality of certain integers of the form 2Arn − 1
 Some prime numbers of the forms 2·3n + 1 and 2·3n − 1
 Chris Caldwell, The Largest Known Primes Database at The Prime Pages
 A Williams prime of the first kind base 2: (2−1)·274207281 − 1
 A Williams prime of the first kind base 3: (3−1)·31360104 − 1
 A Williams prime of the second kind base 3: (3−1)·31175232 + 1
 A Williams prime of the first kind base 10: (10−1)·10383643 − 1
 A Williams prime of the first kind base 113: (113−1)·113286643 − 1
 Williams prime at PrimeWiki
 List of Williams primes

Classes of prime numbers
Mersenne primes